Ajitsinh Dabhi (28 May 1926 – 8 December 2008) was an Indian politician. He was elected to the Lok Sabha, lower house of the Parliament of India from Kheda, Gujarat as a member of the Indian National Congress. he is son of Fulsinhji Dabhi a Koli by caste and a prominent leader of Gujarat Kshatriya Sabha.

Dabhi died in Kheda, Gujarat on 8 December 2008, at the age of 82.

References

External links
Official biographical sketch in Parliament of India website

1926 births
2008 deaths
India MPs 1977–1979
India MPs 1980–1984
India MPs 1984–1989
Indian National Congress politicians
Lok Sabha members from Gujarat